Happily N'Ever After is a 2006 computer-animated family adventure comedy film directed by Paul J. Bolger, produced by John H. Williams, and written by Rob Moreland. It is inspired by fairy tales of the Brothers Grimm and Hans Christian Andersen and is loosely based on the 1999 animated German television series Simsala Grimm. The title is the opposite of a stock phrase, happily ever after; the name is contracted with an apostrophe between the N and the E. The film stars the voices of Sarah Michelle Gellar, Freddie Prinze, Jr., Andy Dick, Wallace Shawn, Patrick Warburton, George Carlin, and Sigourney Weaver. This film was one of Carlin's final works before he died. 

Happily N'Ever After was theatrically released in the United States on January 5, 2007, by Lionsgate. It was panned by critics and earned only $38 million worldwide against a production budget of $47 million. However, it spawned a direct-to-video sequel, Happily N'Ever After 2: Snow White—Another Bite @ the Apple, which was released on March 24, 2009.

Plot
The story begins with the idea that the Wizard controls all of the fairy tales and governs the Scales of Good and Evil, an artifact that maintains the balance of all good and evil in Fairy Tale Land. With the help of his assistants, the uptight Munk and the goofy Mambo, the Wizard checks to make sure that all the fairy tales under his care are "on track" to have their traditional happy endings. However, the Wizard announces his leave for Scotland for a little vacation, so he leaves the kingdom in the hands of Munk and Mambo. Though Munk intends to have the stories go by their traditional endings, Mambo desires for the characters to break free of their pre-destined fates and choose different endings.

Right after the Wizard's leave, both Mambo and Munk fulfill their duties by watching over the story of Cinderella taking place. Known as Ella, the character lives as a servant to her evil stepmother, Frieda, and her equally mean stepsisters. Too fearful to stand up for herself, Ella often dreams of the Prince who will rescue her from her life and sweep her off her feet. However, unknown to Ella, she is pined after by her best friend Rick, a servant of the Prince, and the Prince in question is buffoonish and chauvinistic. As a result of Rick's efforts, Ella is invited alongside her stepfamily to the ball, but Frieda refuses to let the girl go. Fortunately, the Fairy Godmother arrives and grants Ella a gorgeous dress, as well as glass slippers, to wear, on the condition she returns home before midnight. 
 
However, the fairy tale suddenly falls off-track during the ball when Frieda gains access to the Wizard's lair and discovers his book of fairy tales. Once she realizes what will happen to her if Ella succeeds in marrying the Prince, Frieda steals the Wizard's staff from Munk and Mambo, and tips the Scales of Good and Evil, causing a series of fairy tales to go wrong and have unhappy endings. She summons an army of Trolls, evil witches, three Big Bad Wolves, the Giant, and Rumpelstiltskin to her castle. Ella finds out and tries to enlist Rick's help, but Rick, frustrated with her affection for the Prince, refuses, so she escapes to the woods where she meets the exiled Munk and Mambo. They both explain the situation to her and decide to find the Prince (who, unaware of Ella's identity, is searching for his "mystery maiden"), in hopes that he will defeat Frieda. Meanwhile, Frieda sets her villainous army out to capture Ella, causing Rick to have a change of heart and go rescue her.

The trio find the Seven Dwarfs' home, only to discover Frieda's army waiting there for an attack. The Seven Dwarfs help the trio defend themselves from the attackers, and they successfully escape with the help of Rick. unfortunately, after the battle, Rick and Ella have another falling-out over the Prince, with Rick insisting the Prince is not the hero they need. Ella refuses to believe his claims and leaves him so she can find the Prince herself, but after listening to Munk and Mambo's retelling of her original story, Ella grows uncertain if that is what she wants in life, suddenly realizing her feelings for Rick. With some encouragement from Mambo, Ella decides to go after Rick. However, Frieda, angered by her army's inability to capture Ella, decides to go after her herself. Frieda succeeds in kidnapping Ella, but Rick, Mambo, and Munk manage to sneak into the castle to rescue Ella, and together the foursome enter a battle with Frieda over the staff. During the struggle, Frieda seemingly kills Rick with a blast from the staff, but she accidentally creates a portal and loses the staff as she struggles to fight against Ella. Ella, finally fed up with Frieda's treatment of her, punches her in the rift, banishing her from Fairy Tale Land forever and setting the stories back in place. Ella then goes to mourn over Rick, but to her happiness Rick is revealed to have survived, and they both confess their feelings for each other, while the imprisoned fairy tale characters (including the Prince) drive out the villains.

With the Scales tipped back into balance and the kingdom regained, Ella and Rick decide to choose their destinies in a world of happy endings and get married, while a few other fairy tale characters (including the reformed Rumplestiltskin) start to follow suite. Finally, the Wizard returns from vacation, and both Munk and Mambo agree not to tell him about the events that occurred.

In the mid-credits, Frieda is shown trapped in the Arctic surrounded by love-struck elephant seals.

Cast
 Sarah Michelle Gellar as Ella, a beautiful girl and the scullery maid from the tale "Cinderella" and the protagonist of the film. She was formerly in love with the Prince but later realized that her true love is her friend Rick.
 Freddie Prinze, Jr. as Rick, a stressed-out servant who works for the prince and finds him as a grand annoyance. He dreams of marrying Ella, enchanted by her beauty but wonders what she sees in the prince at all.
 Andy Dick as Mambo, a rebellious and goofy purple cat-like creature who works for the Wizard. Bored with the cycle of good endings, he wishes for things to go differently every once in a while but relents when he sees how far out of control things went.
 Wallace Shawn as Munk, an uptight and smart orange pig who also works for the Wizard. Unlike Mambo, he avoids causing trouble in the fairy tales'. He helps Ella stop Frieda from taking over fairy tale land. Although he and Mambo bicker, they're best friends.
 Patrick Warburton as The Prince, the prince of the Cinderella story. Unlike the original prince, he is somewhat lazy and ignorant, but is determined to find his "maiden", Cinderella. He follows steps in a tiny booklet he carries around. The Prince's name is revealed to be Humperdink which is only mentioned in a deleted scene on the DVD release.
 George Carlin as the Wizard, an unnamed ancient wizard who watches over the fairy tales of Fairy Tale Land making sure they go by the book and balances the Scales of Good and Evil to make sure they go well. He leaves his assistants in charge while he goes on vacation in Scotland.
 Sigourney Weaver as Frieda, Cinderella's power-hungry stepmother and the main antagonist. She takes over Fairy Tale Land by rigging the Scales of Good and Evil and takes the Wizard's staff for more power.
 Michael McShane as Rumpelstiltskin, the titular character from the tale "Rumpelstiltskin". He takes the baby from the miller's daughter after Frieda tampers with the Scales of Good and Evil on the scales and assists her.
 John DiMaggio as the Giant, the giant from Jack and the Beanstalk.
 Tom Kenny, Rob Paulsen, and Philip Proctor as Three Amigos, cooks who are friends of Rick.
 John DiMaggio and Tom Kenny as dwarves and trolls.
 Kath Soucie and Jill Talley as stepsisters.
 Kath Soucie as Little Red Riding Hood.
 Tress MacNeille and Jill Talley as witches.
 Tom Kenny and Jon Polito as two out of the three Big Bad Wolves. The Fat Wolf that is voiced by Polito is based on the Big Bad Wolf from "The Three Little Pigs", the Tough Wolf that is voiced by Kenny is based on the Big Bad Wolf from "Little Red Riding Hood", and the Crazy Wolf is the runt of the litter and doesn't speak.
 Lisa Kaplan as the fairy godmother

Release
The film was theatrically released in Australia on December 15, 2006. A premiere in Westwood, California on December 16, 2006 was followed by its North America release on January 5, 2007. The film was released on DVD and Blu-ray on May 1, 2007.

Reception

Critical reception
On Rotten Tomatoes the film has an approval rating of 5% based on reviews from 80 critics. The site's critical consensus is: "Happily N'Ever After has none of the moxy, edge or postmodern wit of the other fairy-tales-gone-haywire CG movie it so blatantly rips off." On Metacritic, the film has a weighted average score of 28 out of 100, based on 22 critics, indicating “generally unfavorable reviews." Audiences polled by CinemaScore gave the film an average grade of “C" on an A+ to F scale.

Box office
The film opened #6 behind Dreamgirls, Freedom Writers, Children of Men, The Pursuit of Happyness, and Night at the Museum, which was at its third week at the #1 position. The film made $6,608,244 during its opening weekend. The film made a total of $15,589,393 at the North America box office. On a $47 million budget, the movie grossed $38.1 million worldwide. It made $16.7 million in DVD sales in the United States.

Accolades
Ruth Lambert was nominated for Best Animated Voice-Over Feature Casting at the 23rd Artios Awards for her work on this movie.

Sequel

A direct-to-video sequel, Happily N'Ever After 2: Snow White—Another Bite @ the Apple, was released on March 24, 2009.

References

External links

 
 
 
 

2006 films
2006 fantasy films
2000s American animated films
American children's animated fantasy films
German animated fantasy films
German children's films
German fantasy films
German independent films
English-language German films
Films about weddings
Films based on Cinderella
Films produced by John H. Williams
2007 computer-animated films
2007 films
Lionsgate films
American parody films
Animated crossover films
Lionsgate animated films
Films based on fairy tales
Fairy tale parody films
Vanguard Animation
2000s parody films
2000s children's animated films
2000s children's fantasy films
2006 directorial debut films
Films about witchcraft
Films about wizards
2006 comedy films
2006 independent films
Films about trolls
2000s English-language films
2000s German films